Margaret John (14 December 1926 – 2 February 2011) was a Welsh, BAFTA award-winning actress, known for her role as Doris O'Neill in Gavin & Stacey.

Early life
Born in Swansea, as a child she wanted to be a nurse or vet, but she could not stand the sight of blood. She occasionally acted at school with her sister Mair. Spotted while acting in a chapel pageant competition, after an audition John trained at the London Academy of Music and Dramatic Art, graduating in 1950.

Career
Margaret John's first public appearances were at Swansea's Grand Theatre, where she had small parts in weekly repertoire. Not being a fluent Welsh speaker, she at times found Welsh language productions challenging. After appearances on radio and in the theatre, she made her television debut in 1956 in a Welsh-language drama.

Her television roles included appearances on episodes of The First Lady, The Troubleshooters, Softly, Softly, The Mike Yarwood Show, Doomwatch, Blake's 7, Secret Army, Lovejoy, My Family, High Hopes, The District Nurse, Casualty, and Doctors. On Radio 4, she appeared on Linda Smith's A Brief History of Timewasting and played Mrs Stone, the school secretary, in the original ten series of King Street Junior from 1985 to 1998.

In a career that spanned more than 50 years, she appeared in such television programmes as: Coronation Street, Dixon of Dock Green, Z-Cars, Doctor Who, Little Britain, Emmerdale, Last of the Summer Wine, Crossroads, Gavin & Stacey and The Mighty Boosh. In the early 1980s, she enjoyed a long run on ITV's daily soap opera Crossroads as doctors' receptionist Marian Owen. Between 2007 and 2010, she portrayed Doris in Gavin & Stacey.

At the 18th BAFTA Cymru Film, Television and Interactive Media Awards on 17 May 2009, at the Wales Millennium Centre in Cardiff Bay, in a ceremony hosted by Gethin Jones, John was presented with the Lifetime Achievement Award.

In September 2009, John appeared in the graphic short film Cow by director Peter Watkins Hughes warning of the dangers of texting while driving.

Also in 2009, John appeared in The Vagina Monologues; prior to that, she had not appeared on stage since the 1980s, when she appeared in Medea at London's Young Vic Theatre, with Dame Eileen Atkins. John subsequently appeared on stage in Calendar Girls at the Wales Millennium Centre from 27 July to 7 August 2010 and at Venue Cymru, Llandudno, from 9 to 14 August 2010, alongside fellow Welsh actress Ruth Madoc, playing Lady Cravenshire, the judge of the WI's cake competition.
She also starred in the 2009 low-budget film A Bit of Tom Jones?, a bawdy farce about the Welsh singer's penis.

In March 2010, she appeared in the BBC One Wales programme Margaret John – National Treasure, which featured clips from the last 50 years of television and special guest interviews with, among others, Ruth Jones, Eve Myles and Joanna Page. The programme was broadcast again, in tribute to John, on 5 February 2011. She also featured in a short BBC video in which she cooked Welsh cakes for St. David's Day.

Her last appearance on screen, broadcast two months after her death, was in Game of Thrones as Old Nan, an elderly servant in the Stark household, who was slated to be a recurring character.

Personal life
Aged 48, she married Ben Thomas, a viola player who performed with the London Symphony Orchestra and Frank Sinatra. He died aged 39, three years after they married, and she did not remarry. They had no children.

Margaret regularly worked for charities, including Sport Relief, Children in Need, Comic Relief, the PDSA and the George Thomas Hospice. She was the face of the National Lottery AdvantAGE campaign, created to provide opportunities for older people.

Death
Margaret John died in hospital in Swansea on 2 February 2011 from liver cancer.

Just before her death, Swansea University awarded her an Honorary Fellowship for her exemplary and inspiring character in relation to old age, particularly as she continued acting until she became ill shortly before her death.

Selected film and television appearances

References

External links
 

 Margaret John Makes Welsh Cakes For St David's Day, BBC Wales video

1926 births
2011 deaths
Actresses from Swansea
Alumni of the London Academy of Music and Dramatic Art
BAFTA winners (people)
Welsh film actresses
Welsh radio actresses
Welsh stage actresses
Welsh television actresses
Deaths from liver cancer
Deaths from cancer in Wales
20th-century Welsh actresses
21st-century Welsh actresses